Strong Memorial Hospital (SMH) is an 886-bed medical facility, part of the University of Rochester Medical Center complex (abbreviated URMC), in Rochester, New York, United States.  Opened in 1926, it is a major provider of both in-patient and out-patient medical services. Attached to Strong is the 190-bed Golisano Children's Hospital, which serves infants, children, teens, and young adults aged 0–21.

SMH is owned and operated by the University of Rochester and serves as its primary teaching hospital.  It offers programs toward medical, dental, or graduate degrees through the School of Medicine and Dentistry.  The hospital anchors the University's health care delivery network in the Rochester area. It serves as a primary community hospital and a regional trauma center for the Rochester area. Also part of the network are Golisano Children's Hospital, and URMC affiliate Highland Hospital.

SMH offers care in 40 different specialties and is ranked as one of "America's Best Hospitals" by U.S. News & World Report, and has won the Consumer Choice Award for the best hospital in the area for 12 consecutive years. Strong has signature programs in cardiac care, cancer care, neurology, orthopedics and pediatrics. As an affiliated academic research hospital, patients have access to the latest treatments. Strong also provides emergency medical services. SMH is a teaching hospital and patients may interact with faculty, residents, fellows, interns and/or medical students.

Human experimentation

From 1945 to 1947, Strong was the site of non-consensual human experimentation programs under supervision of the Manhattan Project and its successor, the United States Atomic Energy Commission. A building adjacent to the hospital and connected to it via tunnel, dubbed the "Manhattan Annex," was constructed in 1943 as a field office for the Manhattan Project. Over a period of two years starting in 1945, a total of seventeen patients admitted to Strong for unrelated ailments were injected with a plutonium or uranium solution without their knowledge. The Atomic Energy Commission tracked the patients for the rest of their lives; after their deaths, the Commission exhumed their remains for testing. Surviving patients were later informed of the true nature of the experiments in 1974.

In recent years, federal regulations for human subject protection and ethical codes for research have been rewritten, in light of this experiment and others around the nation. Strong Memorial Hospital now has a unified human research protection program, which has become a national leader in developing oversight programs to protect people who participate in research studies. In 2007, the University's program received the highest level of accreditation possible from the Association for the Accreditation of Human Research Protection Programs (AAHRPP), an independent accrediting body. The accreditation was granted after demonstrating that safeguards, beyond those federally required, were built into every level of its research operation. The University's oversight program reviews all human research studies, even those that are exempt from regulation by the U.S. Department of Health and Human Services and Food and Drug Administration.

See also
Eastman Institute for Oral Health

References

External links
New Strong Memorial Hospital Website
URMC Website
Classic Strong Health Website

Hospital buildings completed in 1926
University of Rochester
Hospitals established in 1926
Hospitals in Rochester, New York
1926 establishments in New York (state)
Trauma centers